Eyale Le Beau (born 29 January 1989) is a Democratic Republic of the Congo judoka. He represented the DRC at the 2018 African Judo Championships, where he won a bronze medal in the men's -90 kg category. In the 2019 African Judo Championships he came in 5th place. He had also taken part in the 2017, 2018, and 2019 World Judo Championships, not winning a medal.

Achievements

References

External links
 

1989 births
Democratic Republic of the Congo male judoka
Living people
21st-century Democratic Republic of the Congo people